Joan Daemen (born 1965) is a Belgian cryptographer who co-designed with Vincent Rijmen the Rijndael cipher, which was selected as the Advanced Encryption Standard (AES) in 2001. More recently, he co-designed the Keccak cryptographic hash, which was selected as the new SHA-3 hash by NIST in October 2012.
 He has also designed or co-designed the MMB, Square, SHARK, NOEKEON,  3-Way, and BaseKing block ciphers. In 2017 he won the Levchin Prize for Real World Cryptography "for the development of AES and SHA3". He describes his development of encryption algorithms as creating the bricks which are needed to build the secure foundations online.

In 1988, Daemen graduated in electro-mechanical engineering at the Katholieke Universiteit Leuven. He subsequently joined the COSIC research group, and has worked on the design and cryptanalysis of block ciphers, stream ciphers and cryptographic hash functions. Daemen completed his PhD in 1995, at which point he worked for a year at Janssen Pharmaceutica in Beerse, Belgium. He subsequently worked at the BACOB bank, Banksys, Proton World and then STMicroelectronics. Since 2015 Daemen has been professor at the Radboud University Nijmegen.

References

External links
 
 
 

1965 births
Living people
Belgian cryptographers
KU Leuven alumni
Modern cryptographers
People from Hamont-Achel